Robert Weston  (c. 1515–1573) was an English civil lawyer and Lord Chancellor of Ireland.

Robert Weston may also refer to:

Robert Paul Weston (born 1975), author
R. P. Weston (Robert Patrick Weston, 1878–1936), songwriter
Bob Weston (born 1965), American musician, producer and recording engineer
Bob Weston (guitarist) (1947–2012), British musician, briefly guitarist and songwriter with the rock band Fleetwood Mac

See also